Eirenis lineomaculatus is a species of snake in the family Colubridae.
It is found in Israel, Jordan, Lebanon, Palestinian Territory, Occupied, Syria, and Turkey.
Its natural habitats are Mediterranean-type shrubby vegetation, rocky areas, and rural gardens.
It is threatened by habitat loss.

References

Eirenis
Reptiles of the Middle East
Snakes of Jordan
Fauna of Lebanon
Reptiles described in 1939
Taxonomy articles created by Polbot